Charles Smiley is an American politician who served in the Michigan House of Representatives from 2010 to 2017.

Career
For 18 years, Smiley worked at General Motors. From 1978, he worked for the City of Burton, Michigan as a firefighter.

Smiley ran for Burton City Council in 1987 and served until 1991, when he was elected Burton's Mayor, an office he held for 19 years. During his terms, the City votes approved three millages for the police department plus a renewal, and one for the fire department. He also established a volunteer Parks and Recreation Department. While he was publicly accused of bribery and extortion in connection with the federal trial of former public works director Charles Abbey, charges were never filed.

In 2010 he ran for 50th District Michigan State Representative as a Democrat. He ran against Genesee Township Trustee Richard Burrus, U.S. Marine James Cowan, former Richfield Township Supervisor Jeffrey Houston, and Richfield Trustee Gerald Masters in the primary. He won with 33% of the vote. In the November general election, Smiley defeated the Republican Ralph William 53 percent to 47 percent of the vote. The next day, he resigned as Mayor, effective December 31, 2010.
Election Results

References 

Living people
Democratic Party members of the Michigan House of Representatives
1954 births
Mayors of places in Michigan
Michigan city council members
People from Burton, Michigan
20th-century American politicians
21st-century American politicians